Tennis on HBO is a television program produced by the premium cable television network HBO that broadcasts the main professional tennis tournaments in the United States. In 1975, HBO began airing coverage (same day, weekday coverage only) of Wimbledon and did so until 1999. In 2009, HBO broadcast the inaugural Billie Jean King Cup.

Notable moments
In 1983, Beth Herr lost an epic match to Billie Jean King at Wimbledon 8–6 in the 3rd. Commentators on HBO Breakfast at Wimbledon made a very big deal out of her ability to hit numerous swinging volleys out of the air for winners. This was something that had not been done before especially by a female.

Commentators

 Arthur Ashe 1981-1992
 Michael Barkann
 Mary Carillo: Carillo worked as both a host and analyst on HBO's Wimbledon coverage from 1996 to 1999.
 Zina Garrison: Garrison served on HBO's coverage of the 1998 and 1999 Wimbledon Championships.
 Julie Heldman
 Billie Jean King 1984-1999
 Jim Lampley: In 1987, he began working for HBO, covering boxing and HBO's annual telecast of Wimbledon.
 John Lloyd
 Barry MacKay
 Martina Navratilova: She worked as an analyst on HBO's coverage of the Wimbledon Championships from 1995 through 1999.

References

External links
 HBO declines to renew Wimbledon contract after 25 years

HBO original programming
HBO Sports
1975 American television series debuts
1999 American television series endings
HBO
1970s American television series
1980s American television series
1990s American television series
English-language television shows
HBO Shows (series) WITHOUT Episode info, list, or Article